Louis Alphonse Daniel Nicolas (1864-1939)—better known by his pen name A. L. M. Nicolas—was a Persian-born French historian and orientalist who is best known today for his early work on Shaykhism and Bábism. Although primarily remembered for his academic contributions, Nicolas worked as an interpreter and diplomat with the French Consular Service in Persia for most of his life. Nicolas was among the first Western Orientalists to devote substantial attention to the life and teachings of the revolutionary Persian religious figure known as the Báb, and his work continues to serve as an important source for the study of the early history of Shaykhism, Bábism and the Baháʼí Faith.

Biography 
Nicolas was born on 27 March 1864, in Rasht, in the Gilan Province of Iran where his father was stationed with the French Consular Service in Persia. As a young man he learned to speak French, Persian and Russian, going on to study at the Special School for Oriental Languages in Paris. After his studies, Nicolas followed his father's footsteps, joining the consular services in which he served as leading Persian interpreter.

An ongoing disagreement between Nicolas's father and Arthur de Gobineau—secretary and chargé d’affarires at the French legation in Persia, who would go on to be an influential orientalist—led Nicolas to read Gobineau's book Les Religions et Les Philosophies dan l'Asie Centrale. While Nicolas agreed with his father's assessment of Gobineau's work as riddled with errors resulting from Gobineau's limited grasp of Persian and lack of research acumen, it was through this work that he was first exposed to the life and teachings of the Báb. As a result of his research, Nicolas befriended an employee of the consulate who was a member of the Baháʼí Faith, and who assisted him to meet local Bábís and Baháʼís.

As Nicolas continued studying, his interest did not remain purely academic. He developed friendships with local members of the two religions, and undertook to translate a selection of Bábí scriptures. Over the course of translating the Báb's Persian Bayán and Dalá'il-i-Sab'ih (The Seven Proofs) from Persian to French, he developed a growing appreciation for the teachings and person of the Báb, came to identify as a follower of the Báb, or a Bábí. In a 1939 interview, he described this experience:

Notes

References 
 
 
 
 
 
 

1864 births
1939 deaths
People from Rasht
19th-century French people
19th-century French diplomats